The Long Hello Volume Two is a studio instrumental album by Guy Evans and Nic Potter released 1981. It was recorded and mixed at Hidden Drive Studios.

Track listing
 "Surfing with Isabelle" (Nic Potter) – 4:12
 "Elsham Road" (Nic Potter) – 3:35
 "Dolphins" (Nic Potter) – 3:56
 "Carnival" (Nic Potter) – 2:55
 "Broken Chain" (Nic Potter) – 2:35
 "Hidden Drive" (Guy Evans, Nic Potter) – 2:20
 "Indian" (Guy Evans, Nic Potter) – 4:06
 "Zen" (Guy Evans) – 3:12
 "Agua Blanca" (Guy Evans) – 4:13
 "Welcombe Mouth" (Guy Evans) – 3:12
 "Flowing River / Jam"* – 9:22
 "Elsham Road (Live)"* – 6:29
 "A Whiter Shade of Blue"* – 3:04 
Tracks 11, 12 and 13 only on the 1993 Zomart Records CD reissue and recorded live in London, 1991.

Personnel
 Nic Potter – bass, synthesisers, guitars
 Guy Evans – drums, percussion, bamboo too-flutes, synthesizers on "Welcombe Mouth", all instruments on "Agua Blanca"

Guest musicians
 David Jackson – saxophones, flutes on tracks (1–5,13)
 Stuart Gordon – violin on tracks (11–13)
 Huw Lloyd Langton – guitar on tracks (11–13)
 Giles Perring – additional drums on "Hidden Drive"

Credits
 Engineered by – Guy Evans
 Assistant engineer – Nigel Mazlin-Jones
 Cover photography – Anton Corbijn
 Cover artwork – Chris Harris

References

External links
 

1981 albums
Progressive rock albums by British artists